is a Japanese politician of the Democratic Party of Japan, a member of the House of Councillors in the Diet (national legislature).

Overviews 

A native of Kyoto, Kyoto and graduate of the University of Tokyo, he joined the Ministry of International Trade and Industry, receiving a master's degree from Northwestern University while in the ministry. Leaving the ministry in 2000, he was elected to the House of Councillors for the first time in 2001.

References

External links 
  in Japanese.

1960 births
Living people
University of Tokyo alumni
Northwestern University alumni
Members of the House of Councillors (Japan)
People from Kyoto
Democratic Party of Japan politicians